Suwon Lee (born 1977) is a Korean-Venezuelan artist based in Madrid, Spain.

Biography 
Suwon Lee was born in 1977 to Korean parents in Caracas, Venezuela. She migrated from Venezuela in 2016 and often uses space and belonging as a theme in her photographs.   In 2008, she won a grant awarded by Cisneros Fontanals Art Foundation (CIFOs) in Miami, and later that year, she . In this same year, she was included in her first solo show at Periférico Caracas. In the Younger than Jesus Artist Directory (2009), a directory of emerging artists throughout the world, Suwon Lee was the only Venezuelan selected by an international jury to be in the book.  In 2005, Suwon Lee and artist Luis Romero co-founded the alternative contemporary art space Oficina#1, located in Caracas. For her work with Oficnia#1, she was nominated and won the International Young Visual Arts Entrepreneur award from the British Council of Venezuela in 2008. Oficina#1 closed in 2016.

Education 
Suwon Lee earned her BA in French studies at the American University of Paris in 2001.  From 2001 to 2002, she studied photography at Speos Paris Photographic Institute. In 2006, she took the PHotoESPAÑA Masterclass with German photographer Axel Hütte. Alongside her Bachelor's Degree and Masterclass, she worked with Nelson Garrido in his photography workshop in Caracas, Venezuela.

Artworks 
Suwon Lee primarily works in photography focusing on landscapes and cityscapes.  Her images attempt to show a relationship between physical body and the natural world by emphasizing space, time, and light.  More recently, she has worked in nude self-portraits are to show herself as the foreigner and the multicultural identity that she has lived with, being born in Venezuela and coming from Korean parents.

Exhibitions

Collections 
Her artwork is held in major metropolitan museums including MoMA New York, Colección Patricia Phelps de Cisneros, CIFO Miami, and Museu de Arte Brasileira da Fundação Armando Alvares Penteado.

Honors and awards 
 2011 – Young Artist Prize from the Venezuela Association of Fine Artists
 2010 – Emerging Artist Award 2009 from the International Association of Art Critics, Venezuelan Chapter.
 2008 - Recipient of the Grants and Commissions Program awarded by Cisneros Fontanals Art Foundation (CIFO) in Miami.
 2008 - Recipient of the International Young Visual Arts Entrepreneur Award by the British Council.

References

External links 
Official website

Latin American people of Korean descent
Venezuelan women artists
Spanish people of South Korean descent
Artists from Caracas
1977 births
Artists from Madrid
20th-century women artists
Living people
Venezuelan women photographers
Venezuelan people of Korean descent
Venezuelan emigrants to Spain